William Hogg was a Scottish association football wing forward who spent seven seasons in the American Soccer League.

Hogg began his career in his native Scotland, seeing time in nine league games for Dundee United F.C. during the 1921–1922 Scottish league season. In the fall of 1923, he signed with the Brooklyn Wanderers of the American Soccer League. He played only one league game, scoring a goal, that season. Over the next two seasons, he became a regular on the Brooklyn front line, scoring twelve goals during the 1923–24 season. This put him ninth on the league scoring list. Although he scored fourteen goals the next season, he was only sixteenth on the list as scoring across the league exploded. Despite his success, the Wanderers sent him to Providence F.C. seven games into the 1925–1926 season. In 1926, he moved to Philadelphia Field Club. In August 1927, Hogg moved to the Newark Skeeters, but transferred to the New York Giants after fifteen games. During the 1928–1929 season, the Giants left the American Soccer League during the Soccer War and moved to the Eastern Professional Soccer League. Hogg played most of the season with Giants, but finished it with a single game, again scoring a lone goal, with the Brooklyn Wanderers.

External links

References

Scottish footballers
Association football forwards
Dundee United F.C. players
Brooklyn Wanderers players
Providence Clamdiggers players
Philadelphia Field Club players
Newark Skeeters players
New York Giants (soccer) players
American Soccer League (1921–1933) players
Eastern Professional Soccer League (1928–29) players
Scottish expatriate footballers
Scottish expatriate sportspeople in the United States
Expatriate soccer players in the United States
Year of birth missing
Year of death missing